"I Went Too Far" is the tenth single released by Aurora and the sixth single from All My Demons Greeting Me as a Friend. It was written by Aurora, Odd Martin Skålnes and Magnus Skylstad and produced by Magnus Skylstad, Odd Martin Skålnes and Jeremy Wheatley. On July 5, 2016 the song was officially released worldwide. A remix of the song by American DJ MK was released on 15 July 2016.

Background and composition 
The song is described to be a disco-inflected pop and synth-pop song. Aurora started writing this song when she was nine. She explained to the 405: "It's a reminder of how important it is to not give yourself away for anyone else's love. Way too many people tend to stay in relationships where they go through verbal and physical abuse. It's a huge issue that needs awareness."

In a BBC Radio 1 interview she said: "We sometimes go too far for the approval and love of someone else, when we should really just learn to love ourselves and that should be enough."

"When I was 9 I wrote most of this song. I watched someone brave and kind not demanding the respect and love they deserved.

Growing up, I realized these things happen all around us. And we need to learn to be kind to ourselves and demand to be treated right. We all have the chance to climb up the ladder."

Music video 
A music video for the song was released on 5 July 2016. It was directed by Arni & Kinski and was filmed in Iceland.

Track listings 
 Digital download
 "I Went Too Far"  – 3:27
 Digital download - MK Remix (Radio Version)
 "I Went Too Far (MK Remix)"  – 3:57
 Digital download - MK Remix (Extended Version)
 "I Went Too Far (MK Extended Remix)"  – 5:22

Credits and personnel 
Credits adapted from the liner notes of All My Demons Greeting Me as a Friend.

Recording and management 
 Recorded at Lydriket (Bergen, Norway), The Engine Room (London, England) and Angel Recording Studios (London, England)
 Mixed at Lydriket and The Engine Room
 Mastered at Abbey Road Studios (London, England)
 Published by Ultra Music Publishing, Universal Music Publishing, Entertainment Distribution Company

Personnel 
 Aurora Aksnes – vocals, piano
 Odd Martin Skålnes – synth, programming
 Magnus Åserud Skylstad – drums & percussion
 Pete Davis – keyboards & programming

Charts

References 

2016 singles
2016 songs
Aurora (singer) songs
Songs written by Aurora (singer)
Synth-pop songs
Songs written by Magnus Skylstad